Kanyasulkam is famous play in Telugu literature written by Gurajada Apparao.
 Kanyasulkam (film) is a film based on play with same name.